The 1932 United States presidential election in Montana took place on November 8, 1932 as part of the 1932 United States presidential election. Voters chose four representatives, or electors to the Electoral College, who voted for president and vice president.

Montana overwhelmingly voted for the Democratic nominee, New York Governor Franklin D. Roosevelt, over the Republican nominee, President Herbert Hoover. Roosevelt won Montana by a landslide margin of 22.73%.

Results

Results by county

See also
 United States presidential elections in Montana

Notes

References

Montana
1932
1932 Montana elections